The Ita Thao Pier is a pier at Sun Moon Lake in Yuchi Township, Nantou County, Taiwan.

Architecture
The pier features the Ita Thao Visitor Center which also houses the ticketing counter.

Destinations
The pier serves for destinations to Shuishe Pier and Xuanguang Pier at the other perimeter sides of Sun Moon Lake.

Around the pier
 Sun Moon Lake Ropeway

See also
 Transportation in Taiwan

References

Piers in Nantou County